Villers-sous-Ailly (literally Villers under Ailly) is a commune in the Somme department in Hauts-de-France in northern France.

Geography
The commune is situated 8 miles(12 km) southeast of Abbeville, on the D237 road.

Population

See also
Communes of the Somme department

References

Communes of Somme (department)